Mikalojus Daukša (other possible spellings include Mikalojus Daugsza,  and Mikolay Dowksza; after 1527 – February 16, 1613 in Medininkai) was a Lithuanian and Latin religious writer, translator and a Catholic church official. He is best known as the first among Lithuania's humanists to underline the need to codify and promote the Lithuanian language over Chancery Ruthenian and Polish, which were in use in the Grand Duchy at the time. Daukša's Lithuanian translation of Jacob Ledesma's catechism became the first book in Lithuanian to be published in the Grand Duchy of Lithuania.

Born probably after 1527 somewhere in the territory of the Grand Duchy of Lithuania (in Babėnai?), Daukša probably received his education in Vilnius and at one of the Western European Universities. He spoke several languages and had a personal library including books by Erasmus of Rotterdam and Philip Melanchthon.

Daukša was a canon of Medininkai (nowadays Varniai) and an official member of the Samogitia. Under the auspices of bishop Merkelis Giedraitis, he translated the catechism by the Spanish Jesuit theologist Jacobo Ledesma. The postil, translated from the Polish translation by Jakub Wujek, was published in 1595, and became one of the means to fight paganism. Paganism was at that time still practiced in Lithuania. The work also served to counter the growing threat posed to Catholicism by the Reformation, which was promoted in Lithuania by the mighty Radziwiłł family. It was also the first book in Lithuanian to be printed in the Grand Duchy of Lithuania.

In 1599 Daukša published another important work, the Lithuanian translation of the Polish language collection of sermons by Jakub Wujek, the Catholic Postil. There are two prefaces to this work, one in Latin and one in Polish. In the Polish preface, Daukša advocates the promotion of the Lithuanian language in the Grand Duchy and gave a brief definition of the Lithuanian nation and state. The book is regarded as more valuable and important than the Catechism, and constitutes one of the monuments of the Lithuanian language.

In his translations, Daukša used the central High Lithuanian dialect, influenced by both eastern High Lithuanian and Samogitian. As one of pioneers of written Lithuanian, he is credited with the introduction of several neologisms, among them mokytojas (teacher), valia (will), įkvėpimas (inspiration) and išmintis (wisdom). Of special importance for our knowledge of the Lithuanian language are the accent signs Daukša employs in the Postilla.

References

1520s births
1613 deaths
People from Kėdainiai District Municipality
Balticists
16th-century Latin-language writers
Lithuanian Christians
Lithuanian translators
Lithuanian writers
Polish translators
Translators to Lithuanian